Arvo Kalle Olavi Ojanperä (27 October 1921 – 8 May 2016) was a Finnish sprint canoeist who competed in the early 1950s. Competing in two Summer Olympics, he won the bronze medal in the C-1 1000 m event at Helsinki in 1952. He was born in Tyrvää.

References

Olavi Ojanperä's profile at Sports Reference.com

1921 births
2016 deaths
People from Sastamala
Canoeists at the 1952 Summer Olympics
Canoeists at the 1960 Summer Olympics
Finnish male canoeists
Olympic canoeists of Finland
Olympic bronze medalists for Finland
Olympic medalists in canoeing
Medalists at the 1952 Summer Olympics
Sportspeople from Pirkanmaa